The Mumbai Trans Harbour Link, also known as the Sewri–Nhava Sheva Trans Harbour Link, is an under-construction 21.8 km (13.5 mi) 6-lane  access-controlled expressway grade road bridge, which will connect Mumbai with Navi Mumbai, its satellite city. When completed, it would be the longest sea bridge in India. The bridge will begin in Sewri, South Mumbai, will cross Thane Creek north of Elephanta Island, and will terminate at Chirle near Nhava Sheva. The road will be linked to the Mumbai–Pune Expressway in the east and to the under-construction Coastal Road in the west. The 6-lane highway will be 27 meters in width, in addition to two emergency exit lanes, edge strip, and a crash barrier.

The  Mumbai Metropolitan Region Development Authority (MMRDA) awarded contracts for the project in November 2017, construction began in April 2018, and was scheduled to complete within 4.5 years. Construction was delayed by around 8 months due to the COVID-19 pandemic, and is currently expected to complete by December 2023. The MMRDA estimates that 70,000 vehicles will use the bridge daily after it opens.

History
Transportation and traffic planning for Greater Bombay was commissioned for Wilbur Smith and Associates in mid 1962. The firm's report, based on extensive studies conducted over 18 months, was handed over to the Union Ministry of Transport on 19 December 1963. Among other projects, the report proposed the construction of a sea link, known as the Uran Bridge, to connect Mumbai with the mainland near the town of Uran. However, Smith was unsure of the link's feasibility. Citing poor traffic expectations in Uran even in 1981, his report advised a more detailed study of this connection and recommended waiting until "the Trans-Thana area develops further and more community services are extended to Uran." In 1973, the Vashi Bridge linking Mankhurd in Mumbai with Vashi in Navi Mumbai was opened.

First attempt
The first concrete attempt to build the sea link was made in 2004, when Infrastructure Leasing & Financial Services (IL&FS) submitted a proposal to implement the project on a build, own, operate, and transfer (BOOT) basis. The Maharashtra State Road Development Corporation (MSRDC) also submitted a counter proposal. However, the IL&FS proposal was side-lined by the government, for undisclosed reasons.

Second attempt
Another attempt was made in 2005, when the MSRDC invited bids for the project. The bids submitted by the Ambani brothers were considered to be unrealistic. A consortium of the Anil Dhirubhai Ambani Group company Reliance Energy (REL) and Hyundai Engineering & Construction quoted a concession period of nine years and 11 months against 75 years quoted by Mukesh Ambani's Sea King Infrastructure (the only other short-listed bidder left, after Larsen & Toubro-Gammon and IFFCO opted out). The REL-Hyundai consortium was initially disqualified at the technical bid stage as Hyundai did not meet the criteria of $200 million net worth specified in the bid document. However, the consortium challenged the disqualification in the Supreme Court, and the Court granted them 90 days to submit their bid that ended on 15 December 2007. The consortium eventually won the bid in February 2008. However, the MSRDC was not sure about viability of the low concession period. The MSRDC felt that the concession periods were "unrealistic" and that both bids "seemed frivolous in nature".

Third attempt
The Government of Maharashtra called for fresh bids for the project in 2008. However, none of the 13 companies that had shown interest submitted bids. The media criticized the political feud between the ruling Nationalist Congress Party (NCP) and Indian National Congress coalition, as being responsible for slowing "down the pace of Mumbai's development". The city's two infrastructure agencies, the MSRDC and the Mumbai Metropolitan Region Development Authority (MMRDA), under the NCP and Congress respectively, were both planning to construct the MTHL at the same time. The project underwent two failed rounds of tendering under the MSRDC, and was stuck for nearly two years (between 2009 and 2011), before the state government decided to hand over the mandate to MMRDA. Following the decision, the MSRDC asked MMRDA to pay  if it wanted access to any of the studies on the project conducted by the former. After the MMRDA was tasked with executing the MTHL, the MSRDC took up the expansion of the Vashi Bridge by adding six more lanes to ease congestion at the entrance to Navi Mumbai. However, the MMRDA refused the MSRDC's request to allocate funds for the expansion of the Vashi Bridge, as the former believed that the expansion would divert some ridership from the MTHL.

Fourth attempt
The MMRDA appointed Arup Consultancy Engineers and KPMG to conduct the techno-economic feasibility study of the MTHL in August 2011. The MTHL project was proposed as a public-private-partnership (PPP) model. The project received clearance from Chief Minister Prithviraj Chavan on 22 October 2012. The Times of India described the MTHL's delay as being "symbolic of all that's wrong with infrastructure planning and implementation in Mumbai". The paper also stated that a project being "on the drawing board after more than forty years would be in the realm of fiction in any other country".

The project received environmental clearance from the Ministry of Environment and Forests (MoEF) on 23 October 2012. The Maharashtra State Road Development Corporation (MSRDC) had obtained clearance for the project in March 2005, but the certificate was valid only for 5 years and lapsed due to the delays in the bidding process. The MoEF laid down 11 conditions that the MMRDA had to follow. Some of the conditions were that the MMRDA put up noise barriers, replant five times the number of mangroves destroyed, not carry out dredging or reclamation, use construction equipment with exhaust silencers and work in consultation with the Bombay Natural History Society to minimize the impact on migratory birds. Environmental activists are opposed to the clearance. They point out there was no public hearing following the second application for environmental clearance. They believe that the sea link is not allowed as per the new Coastal Regulation Zone (CRZ) notification of 2011. Activists also claim that the sea link would damage a huge mudflat and mangrove tract towards Sewri and Nhava which is a habitat for migratory birds like flamingos. MMRDA plans to construct sound barriers on the bridge so that it does not affect the flamingo habitat at Sewri. The Department of Atomic Energy (DAE) has directed MMRDA to construct a six-km long view barrier to cut the view of Bhabha Atomic Research Centre (BARC). The MTHL received coastal regulation zone clearance from the MoEF on 19 July 2013.

On 31 October 2012, the Department of Economic Affairs (DEA) granted in-principle approval for the MTHL. The DEA recommended granting  with a concession period of 35 years for the project. In the first meeting, between MMRDA and DEA officials in September 2012, the ministry had asked the authority to treat the sea link as a road and reduce the proposed concession period from 45 years to 30 years. They also expected an internal rate of return of 15% for the project. However, the MMRDA wanted a higher rate as they claimed the project was very risky. An internal rate of return of 17% was agreed upon. The termination clause in the concession agreement comes into effect after 30 years into the concession period. The MMRDA can invoke the clause based on certain conditions such as the capacity being higher than expected. The conditions will be reviewed in the 20th year of the concession agreement. The DEA is the first tier of the three-tier clearance process to get viability gap funding (VGF) for the project. The project must also receive approval from an Empowered Committee and finally from the Finance Minister. On 9 November 2012, the State Government issued a state-support agreement and a toll notification for the project. The empowered committee approved VGF for MTHL on 12 December 2012. Finance Minister P. Chidambaram cleared the project on 18 January 2013.

The Jawaharlal Nehru Port Trust (JNPT) asked the MMRDA to build the MTHL at a height of 51 metres, instead of the proposed 25 metres, for a span of 300 metres to accommodate its expansion plans for its fifth container terminal and to allow safe passage of bigger vessels. MMRDA expressed that a height of 51 metres would not be feasible as it would have a huge impact on the cost. However, MMRDA officials expressed willingness to raise the height of the bridge to 31–35 metres. On 8 January 2012, Minister of State for Shipping and MP from South Mumbai, Milind Deora told reporters that JNPT would issue a No Objection Certificate to the State Government to go ahead with the project.

In May 2012, the MMRDA shortlisted five consortia for the project: Cintra-SOMA-Srei, Gammon Infrastructure Projects Ltd.-OHL, Concessions-G.S. Engineering, GMR Infrastructure-L&T Ltd.-Samsung C&T Corpn., IRB Infrastructure Developers Ltd.-Hyundai, and Tata Realty and Infrastructure Ltd.-Autostrade Indian Infrastructure Development Pvt. Ltd.-Vinci Concessions Development V Pte Ltd. None of the five shortlisted firms bid for the project by the deadline, which was extended 5 August. IRB-Hyundai had announced their withdrawal from the bidding process, on 31 July 2013, citing "the government's apathy and unfriendly attitude towards investors wanting to develop capital-intensive infra projects". Following the failure of the tender, the MMRDA decided to abandon the PPP model and instead implement the project on cash contract basis.

In January 2013, the Central Government had sanctioned , which was 20% of the project cost at the time, in viability gap for the MTHL. Under the public private partnership (PPP) basis that the project was proposed to be implemented in, the State Government would also contribute the same amount as the centre, while the remaining 60% would have been borne by the developer who won the bid. The concession period would have been 35 years, which included the time-frame of 5 years for the construction. However, the consortia shortlisted for the project were concerned that 15-20% of the projected traffic for the MTHL, was due to the proposed Navi Mumbai Airport, which was heavily delayed. The MMRDA added provision for a shortfall loan to be made available from the central government if traffic is 20% under the estimate.

Switch from PPP to EPC model
The MMRDA decided to scrap the PPP model for the project in August 2013, and instead execute it on a engineering, procurement, and construction (EPC) basis. Subsequently, the Japan International Cooperation Agency (JICA) expressed interest in providing funds for the project. In January 2014, Ashwini Bhide, MMRDA additional metropolitan commissioner, told The Indian Express that the state government had sent a formal proposal to the DEA for its approval to get funds from JICA. In June 2014, Business Line reported that Jawaharlal Nehru Port Trust authorities had agreed to pick up a stake in the project.

The project ran into a major hurdle in April 2015, when the forest advisory committee (FAC) of the MoEF withheld its clearance for the project stating that it affects "existing mangroves as well as the flamingo population". The project requires clearance from the Ministry as it will affect 38 hectares of protected mangrove forests and 8.8 hectares of forest land on the Navi Mumbai end. The sea link's starting point poses a threat to an estimated 20,000-30,000 lesser and greater flamingos and the mangrove habitat. The Sewri mudflats are home to 150 species of birds species, and is listed as an "Important Bird Area". The FAC instructed the state government to submit a study report on the project's impact on the flamingo population, and recommended that the government seek the help of either the Bombay Natural History Society (BNHS) or the Wildlife Institute of India, Dehradun to conduct the study. The cost of the study will be borne by the MMRDA, which will also have to come with safeguards to cause the least disturbance to the flamingos at Sewri.

On 17 April 2015, Union Minister of Road Transport and Highways Nitin Gadkari stated that he favoured the construction of a submarine tunnel instead of a sea link. Gadkari stated that the tunnel would cost less than a bridge (citing the example of the tunnel between Rotterdam and Belgium), and would also be aesthetically preferable as a sea link would obstruct the city's coastline. However, Gadkari clarified that the Union Government would accept the final decision made by the State Government on this matter. Following a visit to China, Maharashtra Chief Minister Devendra Fadnavis announced on 20 May 2015, that the China Communications Construction Company (CCCC) had expressed interest in the MTHL project. According to Fadnavis, the CCCC will complete the project within 3–4 years of being appointed and will also provide 2% concessional funding for the project.

In November 2015, the project was cleared by the Maharashtra Coastal Zone Management Authority (MCZMA). In January 2016, the Forest Advisory Committee (FAC) granted forest clearance, and the Experts' Appraisal Committee (EAC) attached to the MoEF granted CRZ clearance to the project. The CRZ came with a rider requiring the MMRDA to spend at least 335 crore towards an "environment management programme". In the same month, Fadnavis announced that the project had received all required clearances.

In February 2016, JICA agreed to loan 80% of the total cost of the project to the State Government at an annual interest rate of 1-1.4%. The MMRDA will bear 1.2% of the project cost, and the remaining amount will be borne by the State Government. As JICA was unwilling to loan directly to the state Government, the Union Government stood as a guarantor of the loan. As part of the agreement between JICA and the State Government, 2 rescue lanes will be added to the proposed plan for the MTHL, and a 4 km stretch of the bridge will be constructed as a steel-only structure instead of previous plan to build a cement and concrete bridge. The use of steel on this stretch will raise the project cost by 4000 crores. JICA formally approved the funding agreement on 9 May 2016, and the MMRDA began the bidding process the following day. The MTHL received final environment clearance from the State Forest Department in May 2017.

Tendering 
The MMRDA invited request for qualifications (RFQ) for civil construction of three packages - a  bridge section across the Mumbai Bay and Sewri interchange (6,600 crore), a  bridge section across Mumbai Bay and Shivaji Nagar, near Gavan interchange (4,900 crore), and a  viaduct including interchanges at SH 52, SH 54, and NH 4B near Chirle, Navi Mumbai. The MMRDA received 11 pre-qualification bids each for the first and second package, and 17 bids for the third package. The agency stated that a single party would not be awarded the first and second packages together, although any other combination of the three packages would be permitted. The MMRDA appointed a consortium formed by AECOM Asia Co Ltd, Padeco India Pvt. Ltd, Dar Al-Handsah, and TY Lin International as the general consultant for the project on 26 November 2016. According to UPS Madan, Metropolitan Commissioner, MMRDA, "The General Consultants appointed for the MTHL project will engage in various activities such as to help MMRDA organise pre-bid meetings, examine bid documents, secure various permissions from government, semi-government, examine concept designs, monitor construction of the project and ensure quality of the work among other things."

After evaluating the bids, in January 2017, the MMRDA shortlisted a total of 29 contractors for the three packages and floated tenders for the request for proposal (RFP) stage, the final stage of the bidding process. The agency fixed 5 April 2017 as the final date for submissions of the RFP bids. The submission date was later postponed to 5 June. However, the agency received over 3,000 queries from the short-listed bidders and was forced to postpone the date to 17 July in order to respond to all queries.

The MMRDA applied for security clearance from the Union Home Ministry to carry out construction near the Bhabha Atomic Research Centre, the Mumbai Port Trust and the Jawaharlal Nehru Port Trust. These facilities have restricted areas that are covered by the Official Secrets Act. The MMRDA also submitted the names of all companies that bid for the project to the Home Ministry. The Ministry will grant clearance after consultations with other ministries such as the Foreign Ministry and the intelligence agencies. The Home Ministry denied security clearance to a bid from China Railway Major Bridge Engineering Group in a joint venture with Gayatri Projects Limited, and also to a consortium of IL&FS Engineering Limited and Ranjit Buildcon Limited. Both consortia were subsequently disqualified from the bidding process by the MMRDA. The MMRDA stated that Home Ministry had not provided the agency with any official reason for denying security clearance. IL&FS Engineering filed an appeal against the decision in the Bombay High Court on 18 July. The Court permitted IL&FS to submit its bid, subject to a final decision by the Court.

The MMRDA received bids from 17 of the 29 short-listed contractors by the final bid submission date on 19 July 2017. The agency stated that it would take one month to conduct technical evaluations of the bids and to award contracts. On 9 November 2017, the MMRDA awarded contracts to a consortium of Larsen and Toubro (L&T) and Japan's IHI Corporation, a consortium of Daewoo and Tata Projects Limited (TPL), and L&T to construct the Sewri side of the sea bridge, the Navi Mumbai side of the sea bridge, and the bridge portion on land towards Chirle, respectively. The contracts between the MMRDA and the L&T-IHI Corporation consortium were officially signed on 27 December 2017.

The MMRDA invited bids for package 4 in September 2021. The tender includes the design, supply, installation, testing, and commissioning of an intelligent transport system, toll management, highway and bridge street lighting, electrical works, construction of toll plazas, and administrative buildings.

Land acquisition 
The project requires 130 hectares of land. The City and Industrial Development Corporation (CIDCO) contributed 88 hectares. The remaining land is privately owned. According to MMRDA officials, land owners will be given the same compensation package as that given in the Navi Mumbai International Airport project. Three hundred and twenty structures in Sewri were affected by the project, of which 250 properties were residential. The MMRDA provided resettlement for the affected people by offering accommodation in either Kanjurmarg or Kurla. The majority chose to relocate to Kanjurmarg. The MMRDA also paid  each as compensation to 1,500 fishermen who were affected by the construction of the project. In October 2016, the MMRDA agreed to pay MbPT a total of 1000 crores in instalments over the course of 30 years as rent for using the MbPT's land for construction of ramps for the MTHL on the Mumbai side. The MMRDA will receive 27.2 hectares of land on the Sewri side of the MbPT, of which 15.17 hectares will temporarily be used for the casting yard.

The MMRDA utilized a drone to carry out survey work for the MTHL. The drones were fitted with 360 degrees camera that provide up to 3 millimeter accuracy. The aerial survey takes less time than a regular survey, achieves greater accuracy and helps protect against false claims for compensation. Over 1,000 boreholes were drilled to study the strata. The MMRDA began conducting a geological survey for the project on 15 January 2018. The project work will affect 1,635 trees of which 753 will be cut and the remaining 882 will be replanted at other locations. Most of the trees are located at Sewri and Vakola.

Construction
The MTHL is 21.8 km long, including 16.5 km sea bridge and 5.5 km of viaducts on land on either end of the bridge. It is being be constructed in three sections. Construction of the bridge required the use of 165,000 tonnes of reinforcement steel, 96,250 tonnes of structural steel, and 830,000 cubic metres of concrete. The bridge will feature the first use of orthotropic decks in India. The special steel decks will enable the bridge to have longer spans than possible with regular girders. A total 70 orthotropic decks will be used on the bridge requiring about 96,250 tonnes of steel. The steel spans will make up 6.41 km of the bridge length, while the rest will use concrete. The MMRDA chose to use steel spans in these sections to eliminate the need to construct pillars to support the bridge which could hinder the movement of ships in the area. This 4 km section includes a 180 meter long steel span, which is the longest steel span in India. The shortest steel span on the MTHL is 110 meters long. 

The foundations for the MTHL will be 47 metres at its deepest points in order to support the weight of the bridge. An automated girder launching system was utilized to lay the bridge's foundation, marking the first time the system was used in India. The MMRDA stated that the construction work would generate 115,419 man-months of employment. Prime Minister Narendra Modi laid the foundation stone for the project on 24 December 2016.

Construction of the MTHL began in April 2018 with engineers collecting soil samples for soil testing at each location where piers will be built in Nhava Sheva. MMRDA Metropolitan Commissioner R. A. Rajeev stated on 28 October 2018 that about 9% of the project work had been completed. The first pier of the MTHL was built at Sewri on 18 May 2019. The MMRDA stated that it had begun pre-segment casting work, a precursor to the superstructure for bridge deck construction, on 7 August. Each segment of the viaduct weighs 75 tonnes with dimensions 14.8m x 3.32m x 3.85m. Over 10,000 such segments will be cast. The segments are built at two precast segment yards, one on the Mumbai side and another on the Navi Mumbai side. The first segment will be erected on the Sewri side about 6 km into the sea. MMRDA officials announced the completion of the pre-casting work on 9 August. Officials also stated that they had completed the construction of 270 permanent piles, of which 177 were in the sea. The agency had also completed the construction of a 2 km long temporary access bridge.

Casting for the first segment of Package 3 of the project began on 12 September 2019. On the same date, MMRDA officials also stated that 20% of the total project work had been completed. The first girder, weighing 1,000 tonnes, for the MTHL was launched on 15 January 2020 marking the erection of its first span. The project faced delays due to the COVID-19 pandemic. Over 5,000 workers had been deployed on the project prior to the pandemic, but this was reduced to around 2,000 workers by June 2020. An estimated 27% of the total project work had been completed by June 2020, and 35.29% by November 2020. The BMC Tree Authority granted permission to the MMRDA to cut 454 trees and transplant another 550 trees for the MTHL project on 2 December 2020. The MMRDA stated that it would also plant 2,000 trees in Vasai to compensate for the loss. The agency stated that 40% of the total project work had been completed by the end of June 2021. Minister of Urban Development and Public Works (Public Undertakings) Eknath Shinde's Public Relation Office stated in August 2021 that 52% of the project work had been completed. It also noted that 8,189 staff and labourers were currently deployed on the construction site, and that about 8 months of work days were lost as a result of the COVID-19 pandemic.

The MMRDA stated that it had completed 76% of the total project work on 11 April 2022. On 15 September 2022, Chief Minister Eknath Shinde stated that 84% of the total project work had been completed. The longest orthotropic deck, measuring 180 metres long and weighing 2,400 MT, was launched on 2 November 2022.

Current status

Noise and vision barriers
The MMRDA will install noise and vision barriers on a 6 km section of the MTHL. The vision barriers are intended to block the view of the BARC from the MTHL, while the noise barriers are intended to protect the movement of flamingos and migratory birds at the Sewri mudflats. The MMRDA also stated that it would declare nearly 2 km of the MTHL on the Sewri side as a "silent zone", as well as near schools and other sensitive areas on the Navi Mumbai side of the MTHL. Construction equipment used during the project were fitted with silencers to reduce the potential impact of noise on migratory birds such as flamingos. The project utilized reverse circulation drilling methodology which helps reduce noise levels and helps speed up construction in marine areas.

Bird watching platform 
A 5.6 km long temporary access bridge had been built to transport equipment and workers for the construction of the MTHL. In November 2021, the MMRDA announced that it had decided against demolishing the bridge and would convert it into a bird-watching platform to view flamingos and other birds. The agency noted that the decision would also save the cost of having to demolish the bridge.

Metro lines
Initially, the MTHL was proposed to have dual metros line below the road lanes on the bridge. The metro line was to be extended to the proposed Navi Mumbai International Airport, and connected to the proposed Ranjanpada-Seawoods-Kharkopar corridor of the Navi Mumbai Metro and the proposed Sewri-Prabhadevi corridor of the Mumbai Metro. However, the MMRDA scrapped plans for the metro line in 2012, and decided to build only a road bridge. An MMRDA official stated, "A detailed study has revealed that laying the foundation for the bridge with provisions for two metro lanes would hike costs instead of save money. Hence, it will be feasible to have a separate bridge for the metro in the future." Another reason given was that the Navi Mumbai International Airport and Sewri-Prabhadevi corridor of the Mumbai Metro were still a long way from completion.

In June 2021, the MMRDA stated that it was re-examining the possibility of building metro lines on the MTHL. An MMRDA official stated, "There will be no need for extra construction on MTHL for the Metro line, as we will just have to add tracks. Already, Worli-Sewri underground Metro corridor is being constructed. The Sewri Metro station will connect MTHL, thereby linking it to Navi Mumbai." In September 2021, the MMRDA stated that regardless of the decision on metro lines, the agency would dedicate two lanes on the MTHL for a bus rapid transit system. The agency appointed a consultant to determine whether metro lines could be constructed on the MTHL in January 2022. The draft report of the study submitted in April 2022 found that the MTHL's existing pillars would not be able to support the load of a metro system. MMRDA Metropolitan Commissioner SVR Srinivas stated that the agency was exploring solutions such as increasing the load bearing capacity of the pillars before making a final decision.

Cost
The cost of the MTHL has increased several times. The cost was revised to 6000 crore in 2008. It was then increased to 8800 crore in November 2011 and to 9360 crore in August 2012. The agency received over 3,000 claims for compensation, and it will award payments to genuine claimants after screening the claims.

JICA will fund 85% of the total cost through a loan at a concessional rate of yen-London Interbank Offered Rate plus 0.1% for the project activities, and 0.01% for consulting services, with a 30-year repayment period, including a 10-year grace period. JICA and the MMRDA signed the agreement to disburse the first tranche of the loan on 31 March 2017. The MMRDA will bear 1.2% of the project cost, and the remaining amount will be borne by the State Government. The MMRDA allocated  towards the project in its budget for the 2017-18 fiscal. The MMRDA stated that it had spent  to reduce the environmental impact of the MTHL construction as of August 2021.

MMRDA officials stated that they expected the cost to reduce by 6% as a result of the Union Government's decision to lower the goods and services tax (GST) for construction work from 18% to 12%. The revised cost of the contract would now be . The COVID-19 pandemic caused delays to construction which escalated the project cost by around 5-15%. Cost escalation also occurred because of design changes caused by the location of underground utilities which were different from what planners had assumed.

Connectivity
The MMRDA will construct a 1.5 km long cloverleaf interchange on a 27-acre plot, leased from the Mumbai Port Trust, located east of the Sewri railway station. The loop consists of two lanes branching out from the MTHL and connecting with the Eastern Freeway, the at-grade Messant Road, and the proposed Sewri–Worli elevated road. The Sewri–Worli elevated road will provide onward connectivity to the Coastal Road (at Worli Seaface), Rafi Ahmed Kidwai Marg, and Acharya Donde Marg.

Eastern Freeway

The Eastern Freeway is a  controlled-access freeway that connects P D'Mello Road in South Mumbai to the Eastern Express Highway (EEH) at Ghatkopar. It was opened on 16 June 2014.

Sewri–Worli connector
The Sewri–Worli connector,  also called Sewri–Worli elevated corridor (SWEC), will connect the Bandra-Worli Sea Link and the Mumbai Trans Harbour Link. It will be a four lane, 17 metre wide and 4.512 km long, cable-stayed bridge, with a height of 27 metres. The Sewri–Worli connector will begin at Sewri (East), and cross the Eastern Freeway, the Harbour Line, Rafi Ahmed Kidwai Marg, Acharya Donde Marg, the existing flyover at Ambedkar Road, Elphinstone Bridge in Parel, and the flyover at Senapati Bapat Marg before passing through Kamgar Nagar and Dr Annie Besant Road, and terminating at Narayan Hardikar Marg at Worli. Ramps will connect the Sewri–Worli elevated corridor with Rafi Ahmed Kidwai Marg, west of Sewri railway station, and with Acharya Donde Marg at Mumbai Port Trust.

The Sewri-Worli connector was first proposed by the MMRDA in 2012–2013. The project was estimated to cost , and be completed in four years. The MMRDA received bids from 5 companies to construct the Sewri–Worli connector. They were Simplex Infrastructures Ltd, Larsen & Toubro, Hindustan Construction Company, Gammon India, and the National Construction Company (NCC). Simplex Infrastructures Ltd quoted the lowest bid (nearly 16-17% below the estimated cost of the project), followed by Larsen & Toubro (14% below the reserve price). In April 2016, DNA reported that the project had been cancelled, after previously being put "on hold" in 2015. No budgetary allocation was made for the project in the 2015-16 fiscal, and the MMRDA has no future plans to construct the connector. Apart from delays, the cost increase was also the result of some major design changes. The proposed connector will be built with a steel super structure instead of cement as per the original plan. The MMRDA also proposed additional ramps to link the Sewri–Worli connector with Dr. Rafi Ahmed Kidwai Marg, west of Sewri railway station, and with Acharya Donde Marg at Mumbai Port Trust. Further, the agency will demolish the existing single-tier road over bridge at Prabhadevi railway station and replace it with a new two-tier road over bridge. The agency later paused plans for the connector due to delays with the MTHL project.

The MMRDA floated new tenders for the project in July 2020. The project received clearance from the Maharashtra Coastal Zone Management Authority (MCZMA) on 7 July 2020, and from the Maharashtra State Environment Impact Assessment Authority (SEIAA) on 8 September 2020. J Kumar Infraprojects Ltd was awarded the contract to build the Sewri–Worli connector in November 2020. The project is estimated to cost . Construction began on 13 January 2021. Maharashtra Chief Minister Uddhav Thackeray laid the foundation stone for the project on 21 February 2021. It is expected to open in January 2024.

Toll
In 2012, the MMRDA proposed tolls for the MTHL as 175 for cars, 265 for light commercial vehicles, 525 for buses and trucks, and 790 for multi-axle vehicles. JICA, the primary source of funding the project, proposed higher tolls in 2016. The toll rates levied after the project opened was expected to be much higher due to cost escalations.

The toll collection will be done using an Open Road Tolling (ORT) system. The MMRDA has stated that tolls would be collected until 2045.

See also
 Vikhroli-Koparkhairane Link Road
 Vashi Bridge
 Airoli Bridge
 Sion Panvel Expressway
 Bandra-Worli Sea Link
 Navi Mumbai International Airport

References

Transport in Navi Mumbai
Transport in Mumbai
Proposed bridges in India
Bridges in Maharashtra
Toll bridges in India
Proposed infrastructure in Maharashtra